The  is located in Okayama, Okayama Prefecture, Japan. It is one of Japan's many museums which are supported by a prefecture.

The museum, by architects Okada & Associates, opened in 1988 and has a collection of around two thousand works.

See also

 Okayama Prefectural Museum
 Okayama Orient Museum
 Hayashibara Museum of Art
 Okayama Symphony Hall
 Kōraku-en
 Prefectural museum

References

External links
 Homepage

Okayama
Museums in Okayama Prefecture
Art museums and galleries in Japan
Prefectural museums
Art museums established in 1988
1988 establishments in Japan